Gainesville Lake is a reservoir in northwest Alabama on the Tennessee-Tombigbee Waterway. Close to Gainesville, it is impounded by the Howell Heflin Lock and Dam.

See also
List of Alabama dams and reservoirs

Bodies of water of Pickens County, Alabama
Bodies of water of Sumter County, Alabama
Tennessee–Tombigbee Waterway
Reservoirs in Alabama
Protected areas of Pickens County, Alabama
Protected areas of Sumter County, Alabama